Mulla Abdul Latif Mansur (born 1968) is an Afghan senior leader of the Taliban and current Minister of Energy and Water since 7 September 2021. He is also a central member of the negotiation team in the Qatar office. He previously served as Minister of Agriculture, member of the Taliban Supreme Council, commander in eastern Afghanistan and shadow governor of Nangarhar Province in the previous Taliban government (1996–2001).

Early life
Mansur was born in 1968 in the Gerda Serai District, Paktia Province. He is a nephew of Commander Nasrullah Mansoor and belongs to the Ghilzai tribe. He spent most of his life in Pakistan, where he completed his Islamic studies at the Darul Uloom Haqqania in Akora Khattak, Khyber Pakhtunkhwa Province.

See also
 Amir Khan Muttaqi
 Din Mohammad Hanif

References

Living people
1968 births
Taliban leaders
Taliban government ministers of Afghanistan
Taliban commanders
People from Paktia Province